L. flavescens may refer to:

 Laphria flavescens, a bee-like robber fly
 Larinus flavescens, a true weevil
 Lasius flavescens, a formicine ant
 Leptosoma flavescens, an Asian moth
 Leptospermum flavescens, a shrub native to eastern Australia
 Leucocoprinus flavescens, a basidiomycete fungus
 Leymus flavescens, a true grass
 Lichenostomus flavescens, an Oceanian bird
 Lineus flavescens, a nemertine worm
 Liothrips flavescens, a storm fly
 Lipogramma flavescens, a basslet native to the western Atlantic Ocean
 Lithophyllum flavescens, a thalloid algae
 Lithothamnion flavescens, a red algae
 Litoria flavescens, a frog endemic to Papua New Guinea
 Litsea flavescens, an evergreen native to North America
 Lycoris flavescens, a flowering plant